Helena Dvořáková or Helena Dvořák (born 30 January 1979) is a Czech actress.

Biography 
She was born in Brno, Czechoslovakia. She studied at an academic gymnasium and later continued her studies of dramatic arts at the Janáček Academy of Musical Arts (JAMU) in Brno. She graduated from JAMU in 2002. Following her studies, she spent five seasons at the stage of the City Theatre in Brno. She is a member of the ensemble of Prague's Theatre in Dlouhá.

Theatre

Divadlo v Dlouhé
Lékař své cti .... Doňa Mencía de Acuňa
Vějíř s broskvovými květy .... Siang
Experiment .... Eglé
Onegin was Russian .... Ms. Klepáčová/Gábina
Phaedra .... Phaedra
Maskerade .... Agnes Nitt
The Liar .... Rosaura de Bisognosi
Demons .... Lisavet Nikolaievna

Městské divadlo, Brno
The Seagull .... Masha
Mourning Becomes Electra .... Lavinia
Cabaret .... Sally Bowles
Hair .... Ronny
Kamenný most .... Corallina
Znamení kříže .... Julia Calderón

Another Stage Works 
Life is a Dream, Divadlo U stolu
Macbeth, Divadlo U stolu
1+1=3, Studio G
Variace na chlast
Niekur, Ungelt Theatre, Prague
Ivanov, Činoherní klub, Prague
Man of La Mancha, theatre in Germany

Filmography 
Colette (2013) .... Kordula
Stínu neutečeš (Vnučka) (2009) .... Granddaughter
"Kriminálka Anděl" (2008) TV series .... Jana Chládková (2008–2011)

Awards 
Nejlepší ženský herecký výkon (Best Female) - Role: Anežka Nulíčková in Maškaráda (Grand Festival of Smiling in Pardubice (Won)
Nejlepší ženský herecký výkon (Best Lead Female) - Role: Phaedra in Pahedra (Alfréd Radok Awards (won) and Thalia Awards (nominated))
Nejlepší ženský herecký výkon (Best Female) - Role: Julia Calderón in Znamení kříže (Alfréd Radok Awards) (nominated)
Nejlepší ženský herecký výkon (Best Female) - Role: Lady Macbeth in Macbeth (Thalia Awards and Alfréd Radok Awards) (nominated)

Personal life 
Helena plays flute and singing in the choir and with folk band.

References

External links 

Helena Dvořáková (City Theatre in Brno)
Helena Dvořáková: Všechno je, jak má být (Žena a život) 

1979 births
Living people
Actors from Brno
Czech television actresses
Czech stage actresses
Czech film actresses
Actors of Městské divadlo Brno
20th-century Czech actresses
21st-century Czech actresses
Recipients of the Thalia Award